Ludranski Vrh is a dispersed settlement in the hills south of Črna na Koroškem in the Carinthia region in northern Slovenia.

Name
The name Ludranski Vrh is believed to be a corruption of Luteranski Vrh (literally, 'Lutheran Peak'). In the past, there were many Lutherans living in the area around Črna na Koroškem.

Landmarks

Najevnik linden tree

The Najevnik linden tree in Ludranski Vrh, an about 700 years old Tilia cordata, is the tree with the largest girth in Slovenia (10.70 meters; its height is 24 m). The tree is named after the Najevnik Farm. It is a prominent veteran tree reminiscent of the Ottoman invasions and the legendary King Matjaž. It is a place of cultural events, and every July or June a national meeting of Slovene politicians takes place under it.

References

External links
Ludranski Vrh on Geopedia

Populated places in the Municipality of Črna na Koroškem